Monatepil is a calcium channel blocker and α1-adrenergic receptor antagonist used as an antihypertensive.

Synthesis

Acylation of [1745-53-5] (1) with 4-chlorobutyryl chloride [4635-59-0] (2) then leads to the corresponding amide 4-Chloro-N-(5,11-dihydro-10-thia-dibenzo[a,d]cyclohepten-5-yl)-butyramide [103379-37-9] (3). Alkylation with para-Fluorophenylpiperazine [2252-63-3] (4) then completed the synthesis of monatepil (5).

References

Alpha-1 blockers
Calcium channel blockers
Carboxamides
Dibenzothiepines
Fluoroarenes
Phenylpiperazines